The Woodbine Historic District in Woodbine, Georgia was listed on the National Register of Historic Places in May 1999.

It includes the 1928-built Camden County Courthouse and the Atkinson Memorial Building (210 East 4th Street).  The Atkinson Building was built in 1947 according to the NRHP form, but the plaque on the building says that it was built in 1944. The courthouse was designed by architect Julian de Bruyn Kops (1862-1942) in Late Gothic Revival style and has "shaped parapets with battlements, drip-mold window crowns, and front portico with castellations".  The Atkinson Building is the only International Style structure within the district.

See also
 National Register of Historic Places listings in Camden County, Georgia

References

External links
 

Geography of Camden County, Georgia
Historic districts on the National Register of Historic Places in Georgia (U.S. state)
Queen Anne architecture in Georgia (U.S. state)
Gothic Revival architecture in Georgia (U.S. state)
National Register of Historic Places in Camden County, Georgia